Freedom and Direct Democracy (SPD) is a right-wing populist political party in the Czech Republic. It is led by Tomio Okamura and it holds 20 seats in the Chamber of Deputies.

It has been described as right-wing or far-right on the political spectrum. It expresses opposition to immigration and it is staunchly Eurosceptic, while in their political program they state their support for direct democracy.

History
The party was founded in May 2015 by Tomio Okamura and Radim Fiala when eight Members of Parliament split from the Dawn of Direct Democracy parliamentary group. As the party was newly-formed in that parliamentary term, these MPs sat as independents until the 2017 Czech legislative election. Following that election, the party now holds 22 seats in the Czech Chamber of Deputies. 
 
Freedom and Direct Democracy is named after the European Parliament Eurosceptic political group Europe of Freedom and Direct Democracy. The party has links with Marine Le Pen's National Front which is a member of the Europe of Nations and Freedom, a separate Eurosceptic political group in the European Parliament and Marine Le Pen endorsed SPD before the 2017 Czech legislative election.

In December 2017, SPD hosted a conference of the Movement for a Europe of Nations and Freedom in Prague, with parties such as the French National Front, Dutch Party for Freedom, Freedom Party of Austria and Lega Nord of Italy.

In 2019, following the European Parliament elections, the SPD entered the European Parliament  with two MEPs, who sit with the Identity and Democracy group.

In July 2020, SPD MP Tereza Hyťhová defected to become the third MP for the Tricolour Citizens' Movement.

During the 2021 Czech legislative election, the SPD finished fourth with 20 MPs. On 14 September 2022 MEP Hynek Blaško left SPD due to disagreement with Okamura's leadership of the party.

Policies and ideology
On its website and policy brief, SPD refers to itself as "a patriotic and democratic movement" with a focus on political reform, law and order, direct democracy, entrepreneurship and national sovereignty. It also claims to seek support from ordinary working citizens, small business owners and middle class professionals. The party also wants to reduce state-surveillance, reform the Czech tax system, support internet freedom and encourage more citizen led participation in national politics. Political commentators have variously described the party as right-wing populist, nationalist and anti-immigration in its platform and rhetoric.

The party is opposed to Czech membership of the European Union and calls for the Czech Republic to leave the bloc. The party also wants to pursue a more restrictive immigration policy, particularly towards immigration from Islamic nations, and rejects multiculturalism. It is strongly opposed to illegal immigration and the EU's policy of migrant quotas. The party itself claims that it does not seek to promote hatred towards any race or culture, but argues for the protection of "Judeo-Christian" values and believes that migrant quotas will lead to the "Islamization" of Europe.

Organisation

Membership
Tomio Okamura often claims that SPD has a membership of thousands of members. In October 2017 he claimed that SPD has 7,000 members, and in November 2017 12,000 members. Doubt has been cast on these figures, with the suggestion that Okamura often conflates numbers of supporters with actual members. It was reported in 2015 that SPD had only 20 members, compared to Okamura's claims of 10,000. In February 2018 the party stated that it had 1,200 members. The party had 1,400 members in July 2018.

Election results

Presidential

Chamber of Deputies

Senate

Local election

European Parliament

Regional election

Prague municipal elections

Representation

Chamber of Deputies
 Party president – Radim Fiala 
 Vice-chairman – Radek Rozvoral
Jaroslav Bašta
Oldřich Černý
Jaroslav Dvořák
Jaroslav Foldyna
Jaroslav Holík
Jan Hrnčíř
Zdeněk Kettner
Jiří Kobza
Radek Koten 
Vladimíra Lesenská
Karla Maříková
Tomio Okamura
Marie Pošarová
Jan Síla
Karel Sládeček
Lucie Šafránková
Iveta Štefanová
Radovan Vích
Vladimír Zlínský

European parliament
 Ivan David

References

Further reading

External links
Official website

 
2015 establishments in the Czech Republic
Political parties established in 2015
Direct democracy parties in the Czech Republic
Eurosceptic parties in the Czech Republic
Far-right political parties in the Czech Republic
Right-wing populism in the Czech Republic
Anti-immigration politics in Europe
Anti-Islam political parties in the Czech Republic
Nationalist parties in the Czech Republic
Member parties of the Identity and Democracy Party
Right-wing populist parties
Right-wing parties in the Czech Republic